Series 36 of University Challenge began on 7 August 2006 and was broadcast on BBC Two. This is a list of the matches played, their scores, and outcomes.

Main draw

 Winning teams are highlighted in bold.
 Teams with green scores (winners) returned in the next round, while those with red scores (losers) were eliminated.
 Teams with orange scores have lost, but survived as highest scoring losers.
 Teams with black scores have been disqualified.

First round

Highest Scoring Losers Playoffs

Second round

Quarterfinals

Semifinals

Final

 The trophy and title were awarded to the Warwick team comprising Rory Gill, Harold Wyber, Daisy Christodoulou and Prakash Patel. They beat a Manchester team of Tim Hawken, Adam Clark, Ciaran Lavin and David Elliott in the final.
 The trophy was presented by Ann Widdecombe.
 Daisy Christodoulou reappeared on the programme, again representing Warwick, in a Christmas special edition in December 2011, this time alongside Vadim Jean, captain Christian Wolmar and Carla Mendonça. In the first round, Warwick won with a score of 225, giving them a place in the semi-finals, in which the team scored 265, securing their place in the final. In the final, the team secured a much lower score of 60, and lost out to Trinity College, Cambridge. In the first round, Christodoulou answered the most starter-for-ten questions out of both teams, and in the semi-final, she also answered many starter questions correctly.

External links
Blanchflower Results Table from blanchflower.org

2007
2006 British television seasons
2007 British television seasons